The 2018 UST Growling Tigers men's basketball team represented University of Santo Tomas in the 81st season of the University Athletic Association of the Philippines. The men's basketball tournament for the school year 2018-19 began on September 8, 2018, and the host school for the season was National University.

The Tigers finished sixth at the end of the double round-robin eliminations with 5 games and 9 losses. UST at one point during the second round was at fourth place in the standings, but they went on to lose all four of their remaining games and crashed out of the Final Four matches.

They had an average losing margin of 21.0 points and an average winning margin of 9.8 points.

Two of the Growling Tigers' opponents gave them blowout losses in both rounds of the eliminations. The Ateneo Blue Eagles won over them by 32 and 40 points in each round, while the De La Salle Green Archers won by 27 and 41 points.

The 41-point loss to La Salle was the worst in the career of Aldin Ayo, the one-time back-to-back NCAA and UAAP champion coach.

Returning fourth year point guard Renzo Subido was chosen Player of the Week by the UAAP Press Corps in the first round of eliminations for the duration of September 12–16, while rookie CJ Cansino received the citation twice on the weeks of October 10–14 and October 24–28.

Cansino, the Season 80 Juniors MVP also made history when he became the first rookie to score a triple-double since UAAP statistics were first officially recorded in 2003. Against the UE Red Warriors in the second round, Cansino tallied 20 points, 14 rebounds, and 10 assists.

The Growling Tigers also recorded a single-game league best 59 rebounds in their opening game on September 8, 2018, against the NU Bulldogs.

Roster

Depth chart

Roster changes 
Only big man Jeepy Faundo has graduated, but the team experienced an exodus of players before the start of the UAAP season.

Regie Boy Basibas, who had suited up for the Tigers in their preseason games, and Joco Macasaet, their veteran center, were both faced with uncertainties regarding the league's age eligibility rules as both players were turning 25 within the school year. Both of them decided to move on from the team to play in the commercial leagues.

Jordan Sta. Ana also played in the preseason, but decided to go on leave due to personal reasons. He later announced his transfer to Letran.

The official lineup for UST's Season 81 campaign consisted of nine new players (eight rookies, one transferee), four holdovers and two returnees.

With a champion coach tapped to handle the team, analysts have stressed how the team is still in a rebuilding phase and have once again predicted UST to miss out on a Final Four finish.

Subtractions

Additions

Recruiting class

Coaching changes 
Aldin Ayo replaced Boy Sablan as head coach on January 11, 2018. The coaching change was announced by Institute of Physical Education and Athletics (IPEA) director Fr. Jannel Abogado following Sablan's resignation on November 20, 2017, together with his entire coaching staff.

Ayo, a former player of the 1998 and 1999 NCAA champion Letran Knights came into coaching prominence after leading the Knights to the 2015 championship on his first year and duplicating the feat when he jumped over to the UAAP to lead La Salle to the 2016 championship. At the end of Season 80, he made a decision to sign with UST where he will coach the men's basketball team for the next six years.

Coaching Staff 
Appointed as Ayo's deputies were McJour Luib, Kristoffer Co, Bonnie Garcia, Randy Alcantara, Jason Misolas, Nap Garcia, Ruden de Vera, Philip Go, Marvin Pangilinan, and Noel Zorilla.

McJour Luib was a player of the 2015 NCAA champion Letran Knights under Ayo. After his second and last playing year in 2016, he accepted an invitation to be in Ayo's coaching staff at La Salle. He was the first to join Ayo at UST, where aside from scouting opponents, he will also coach the Tiger Cubs' under-15 basketball team.
Kristoffer Co was also a member of Ayo's coaching staff at La Salle.
Bonnie Garcia is a veteran coach who led the Colegio de San Lorenzo Griffins to the 2017 UCBL and NCR-UCLAA championships.

He was also the head coach of the Sta. Lucia basketball team in the PCBL in 2015, as well as a team consultant for the FedEx Express team in the PBA before becoming full-fledged coach in 2003. The former coach of the Manuel L. Quezon University Pythons also called shots in the MBA: for the Pampanga Dragons in 2000, and the Laguna Lakers in 1998 and 2001. He was an assistant coach of the Mapúa Cardinals under Atoy Co, and the San Beda Red Lions under Frankie Lim.

As a collegiate player, Garcia was the team captain of the three-time Metro Manila Universities Athletic Association (MMUCAA) champions, the FEATI University Hi-Flyers.

He was chosen to replace Chris Cantonjos as the head coach of the UST Tiger Cubs.

Randy Alcantara is the head coach of the San Juan Knights basketball team in the MPBL and the Malayan High School of Science Red Robins. He is also an assistant coach of the Mapúa Cardinals under Atoy Co.

Alcantara was being seriously considered to replace Aldin Ayo as Letran's head coach but school officials eventually decided to hire Jeff Napa for the position.

He was a former Mapúa Cardinal who played for the Tanduay franchises in the PBL and in the MBA for the Laguna Lakers under coach Bonnie Garcia. He was picked by the Formula Shell team in the third round of 1998 PBA rookie draft.

Former PBA player Jason Misolas was a teammate of Aldin Ayo at Letran when they won the NCAA men's basketball title in 1999.
Napoleon Garcia is a member of the Letran Knights' coaching staff under Jeff Napa. He was also an assistant coach of the University of Baguio Cardinals and the San Sebastian Staglets juniors basketball team.
Ruden de Vera was one of Ayo's assistant coaches at Aemillanum College in Sorsogon City in 2009.
Philip Lee Go was hired as the strength and conditioning coach of the Growling Tigers. He has been the strength and conditioning coach of the Café France team in the PBA D-League since 2012. He also joined the San Juan Knights' staff in the MPBL and the Saint Stephen's High School later in the year.
Marvin Pangilinan has been the physical therapist of the Tigers since 2017. He has been the strength and conditioning coach of the basketball and volleyball teams of Mapúa since 2016, and Chiang Kai Shek since 2014. He also served as Kaya FC's physiotherapist from 2015 until 2016.
Noel Zorilla was a UST Yellow Jackets' head cheerleader. He is also the strength and conditioning coach of the Adamsom Lady Falcons basketball team and the Imus Bandera team in the MPBL.

Injuries 
Steve Akomo's season was cut short after only four games due to a season-ending concussion. He missed the October 3 game against La Salle on suspected food poisoning, but was later found to have blood clots in the head.

Akomo was also not able to play in the preseason due to a knee injury.

CJ Cansino sustained an ACL injury during their game against the UP Fighting Maroons in the second round. He sprained his left foot during their previous game against the Adamson Falcons and had to be assisted in getting up for treatment in the team's locker room. He came back to finish the game with less than two minutes left in the fourth quarter. He also sprained his ankle as a result of a bad landing from a layup drive at the end of the first half during their game against UE in the second round. He came back to start the second half and ended the game with a triple-double.
Renzo Subido missed their game against the UE Red Warriors in the second round after suffering an injury on his left ankle. He was back for their next game against La Salle. He also missed some preseason games due to another ankle injury.
JM Lagumen injured his right leg in the second round of eliminations which caused him to miss the remaining games of the season.
Mario Bonleon had a few on-and-off injuries throughout the season. He had a shoulder injury during one of their preseason games and got injured again with less than two months to go before the start of the UAAP tournament.
Enric Caunan missed some preseason games due to a foot injury.

Schedule and results

Preseason tournaments 

The Filoil Preseason Cup games were aired on 5 Plus and ESPN 5. The UCBL games were aired on Solar Sports.

UAAP games 

Elimination games were played in a double round-robin format. All games were aired on ABS-CBN Sports and Action and Liga.

Notes

UAAP Statistics 

|- bgcolor=#ffffdd
| Renzo Subido || 13 || 2 || style=|29.3 || 62 || 196 || 31.6% || 42 || 126 || 33.3% || 38 || 47 || 80.9% || 2.5 || 1.9 || 0.4 || 0.0 || 3.2 || style=|15.7
|-
| Marvin Lee || 14 || 13 || 29.0 || 59 || 181 || 32.6% || 44 || 141 || 31.2% || 39 || 41 || style=|95.1% || 3.4 || 2.1 || style=|1.4 || 0.1 || 2.2 || 14.4
|- bgcolor=#ffffdd
| CJ Cansino || 13 || 13 || 27.3 || 51 || 117 || 43.6% || 14 || 38 || style=|36.8% || 50 || 63 || 79.4% || style=|10.3 || style=|3.6 || 0.5 || 0.2 || 2.9 || 12.8
|-
| Steve Akomo || 4 || 1 || 25.4 || 15 || 28 || style=|53.6% || 0 || 0 || 0.0% || 9 || 16 || 56.3% || 9.5 || 0.3 || 0.0 || style=|1.8 || 2.3 || 9.8
|- bgcolor=#ffffdd
| Zach Huang || 14 || 12 || 22.7 || 40 || 100 || 40.0% || 1 || 9 || 11.1% || 35 || 53 || 66.0% || 6.0 || 1.2 || 0.3 || 0.0 || 1.1 || 8.3
|-
| Germy Mahinay || 13 || 0 || 17.2 || 23 || 56 || 41.1% || 0 || 0 || 0.0% || 12 || 22 || 54.6% || 5.7 || 0.2 || 0.2 || 0.5 || 1.9 || 4.5
|- bgcolor=#ffffdd
| Joshua Marcos || 14 || 2 || 12.8 || 18 || 43 || 41.2% || 4 || 14 || 28.6% || 9 || 18 || 50.0% || 2.9 || 1.1 || 0.1 || 0.1 || 1.6 || 3.5
|-
| Ken Zamora || 14 || 12 || 17.2 || 14 || 78 || 18.0% || 11 || 66 || 16.7% || 7 || 10 || 70.0% || 1.6 || 1.5 || 0.3 || 0.0 || 0.6 || 3.3
|- bgcolor=#ffffdd
| Enric Caunan || 13 || 13 || 12.9 || 16 || 42 || 38.1% || 0 || 0 || 0.0% || 6 || 8 || 75.0% || 2.4 || 0.4 || 0.0 || 0.9 || 0.4 || 2.9
|-
| Ira Bataller || 12 || 1 || 13.4 || 9 || 35 || 25.7% || 2 || 13 || 15.4% || 9 || 16 || 56.2% || 3.1 || 0.6 || 0.0 || 0.0 || 1.3 || 2.4
|- bgcolor=#ffffdd
| Toby Agustin || 10 || 0 || 9.0 || 9 || 24 || 37.5% || 1 || 5 || 20.0% || 5 || 8 || 62.5% || 2.4 || 0.5 || 0.1 || 0.5 || 0.8 || 2.4
|-
| Mario Bonleon || 8 || 0 || 5.9 || 5 || 17 || 29.4% || 1 || 10 || 10.0% || 4 || 6 || 66.7% || 0.8 || 0.5 || 0.0 || 0.1 || 0.5 || 1.9
|- bgcolor=#ffffdd
| Nat Cosejo || 11 || 1 || 9.7 || 8 || 28 || 28.6% || 1 || 3 || 33.3% || 3 || 6 || 50.0% || 3.5 || 0.3 || 0.0 || 0.1 || 0.5 || 1.8
|-
| Dave Ando || 2 || 0 || 6.2 || 1 || 3 || 33.3% || 0 || 0 || 0.0% || 0 || 0 || 0.0% || 1.0 || 0.0 || 0.0 || 0.0 || 0.0 || 1.0
|- bgcolor=#ffffdd
| JM Lagumen || 3 || 0 || 4.2 || 1 || 5 || 20.0% || 0 || 1 || 0.0% || 0 || 0 || 0.0% || 1.0 || 0.0 || 0.3 || 0.0 || 0.3 || 0.7
|- class=sortbottom
! Total || 14 ||  || 40.0 || 328 || 954 || 34.4% || 121 || 426 || 28.4% || 226 || 313 || 72.2% || 44.8 || 12.9 || 3.4 || 2.6 || 17.1 || 72.1
|- class=sortbottom
! Opponents || 14 ||  || 40.0 || 440 || 834 || 52.8% || 86 || 313 || 27.5% || 182 || 257 || 70.8% || 44.5 || 16.4 || 5.9 || 4.8 || 13.0 || 82.0
|}

Source: Imperium Technology

Awards

References 

2018–19 in Philippine college basketball
UST Growling Tigers basketball team seasons